Vietnamese calligraphy (Vietnamese alphabet: , Chữ Hán: 書法越南) relates to the calligraphic traditions of Vietnam. It includes calligraphic works using a variety of scripts, including historical chữ Hán (Chinese characters), Chữ Nôm (Vietnamese-derived characters), and the Latin-based Vietnamese alphabet. Historically, calligraphers used the former two scripts. However, due to the adoption of the Latin-based chữ Vietnamese alphabet, modern Vietnamese calligraphy also uses Latin script alongside chữ Hán Nôm.

Traditional Vietnamese calligraphy is strongly affected by that of China. Chữ Hán was often used as a literary language in ancient Vietnam, and as a result, Vietnamese calligraphy also used to follow Chinese calligraphy’s standard and used chữ Hán in many of its writings. For example, during the Lý dynasty, its style was similar to China’s Tang dynasty (618-907). During the Trần dynasty, it was influenced strongly by China’s Song (960-1279) and Yuan (1271-1368) dynasties.

Nonetheless, over time, Vietnam developed its own styles of calligraphy historically for writing both Chữ Hán and Chữ Nôm. In the later Lê dynasty, Vietnam developed a unique style of calligraphy called "Nam tự" by Phạm Đình Hổ in his book  (Written on Rainy Days - ). It was first used in bureaucracy only but later became popular for all writing purposes.

In modern times, calligraphy has been done frequently in the Latin-based Vietnamese alphabet, as Chữ Nôm and Chữ Hán have largely fallen out of use. Chữ quốc ngữ calligraphy gained popularity during the New Poetry and Free Poetry Movements, due to the increasing popularity of using the Vietnamese vernacular, as well as influence from French literature. Modern Vietnamese calligraphy is influenced by modern Latin cursive but is written using the calligraphy brush, rather than quill or reed pens as is done in Western calligraphy. Vietnamese calligraphy can be used to write poems, festive banners, signage, and so on.

Vietnamese calligraphy artwork

See also

Chinese calligraphy
History of writing in Vietnam
Vietnamese alphabet
Chữ nôm

References

Vietnamese culture
Vietnamese inventions
Vietnamese calligraphy